The groundscraper thrush (Turdus litsitsirupa) is a passerine bird of southern and eastern Africa belonging to the thrush family, Turdidae. It was previously considered the only member of the genus Psophocichla, but phylogenetic analysis supports it belonging in the genus Turdus, of which it is the most basal species.

The upperparts are plain grey-brown with a chestnut wing-panel. The underparts are white with black spots and the face is white with bold black markings. The underwing has a black and white pattern which is visible during the undulating flight. The bird has a slow whistled song and a clicking call.

There are three subspecies: T. l. litsitsirupa is the most southerly form, occurring from Namibia, Botswana, Zimbabwe and Mozambique south to northern and eastern parts of South Africa. T. l. pauciguttata is found in southern Angola, northern Namibia and north-west Botswana while T. l. stierlingae occurs in a band from northern Angola across to western Tanzania, Malawi and north-west Mozambique. It can be tame and will forage in parks, gardens and around picnic sites. The Ethiopian thrush (Turdus simensis) has sometimes been treated as a subspecies.

The cup-shaped nest is built using vegetation and spider-webs and is lined with feathers or leaves. Three or four eggs are laid and are incubated for 14 to 15 days. They are bluish with lilac and red-brown spots and blotches.

References 

Sinclair, Ian & Ryan, Peter (2003) Birds of Africa south of the Sahara, Struik, Cape Town.

External links 

 Groundscraper thrush – Species text in The Atlas of Southern African Birds

groundscraper thrush
Birds of East Africa
Birds of Southern Africa
groundscraper thrush
Taxobox binomials not recognized by IUCN